Advance (pronounced with the stress on the first syllable) is an unincorporated community and census-designated place (CDP) in Davie County, North Carolina, United States. It is seventy-five miles northeast of Charlotte. As of the 2010 census it had a population of 1,138. It is located along North Carolina Highway 801 just south of Bermuda Run. Advance is part of the Piedmont Triad region of North Carolina.

Geography
Advance is located in eastern Davie County. The Yadkin River forms the eastern edge of the CDP and is the Davidson County line. Neighboring communities and municipalities include Bermuda Run,  to the north, and Mocksville, the Davie County seat,  to the west. The largest neighboring city is Winston-Salem, NC.

Advance is home to Shady Grove Elementary School and William Ellis Middle School.

Demographics

2020 census

As of the 2020 United States census, there were 1,499 people, 469 households, and 320 families residing in the CDP.

Etymology
Various accounts exist for the origin of the town's name. Some suggest the name was derived from the name of a popular resident and freed slave, Samuel Vance Allen. Other accounts suggest the community was named by residents who hoped that with the addition of a post office, the community would advance.

Encompassing communities
While Advance remains unincorporated, it is recognized by the US Postal Service under ZIP code 27006. The common area of Advance includes several smaller unincorporated communities that are not recognized by the Postal Service:

Bixby
Cornatzer
Farmington (south of Spillman Road)
Fork Church
Fulton
Hillsdale
Redland
Shady Grove
Smith Grove

Housing developments include Oak Valley, Underpass Road Communities (Greenwood Lakes, Westridge, Countryside, Eastside), Hidden Creek, and others.

Local businesses
Advance has had several businesses that were prominent through its history. A few of these include:

801 Shell 
Advance Barber Shop 
Advance Car Wash (building still standing, but the business has long been closed down) 
Advance Country Store 
Advance Florist
Advance Video – (no longer in business) known locally as Jitter's.
Allen Geomatics – a Land Surveying firm
Jeffco – a salon equipment and fixture company
L&G Hair Design – (closed)
Sparkle Clean Pools – Swimming pool services
Tucker's Place restaurant – located in the building that once housed Advance Video
Vogler's TV & VCR Service – a television repair shop
Wright Farm Gates – a farm and ranch equipment distribution company

Schools and civic service
 Advance Masonic Lodge
 Advance Volunteer Fire Department
 Davie Civitan Club
 Cornatzer Elementary School
 Macedonia Moravian Preschool
 Shady Grove Elementary School
 William Ellis Middle School
 Davidson County Community College, Kinderton Campus

Churches
Advance Baptist Church
Advance United Methodist Church
Bethlehem United Methodist Church 
Calvary Baptist Church, West Campus (March 2009)
Elbaville Methodist Church
Fulton United Methodist Church 
Hillsdale Baptist Church
Hillsdale United Methodist Church
Macedonia Moravian Church
Mocks United Methodist Church
Piney Grove United Methodist Church
Redland Church Of Christ
Redland Pentecostal Holiness Church
Yadkin Valley Baptist Church
Mt. Sinai A.M.E Zion Church

Landmarks
One significant landmark in the Advance area is the Vestal Potts Gymnasium. The basketball gymnasium is named after legendary coach Vestal Potts who coached Shady Grove's basketball teams to numerous championships.

Fulton United Methodist Church and John Edward Belle Shutt House and Outbuildings are listed on the National Register of Historic Places.

Notable people
Advance has several notable citizens. These include:

 Ted Budd, United States Congressman

References

External links
 Advance Fire Department
 Underpass Road Communities

Census-designated places in Davie County, North Carolina
Census-designated places in North Carolina